Aracar is a large conical stratovolcano in northwestern Argentina, just east of the Chilean border. The volcano has formed, starting during the Pliocene, on top of a lava platform and an older basement. Inca archeological sites are found on the volcano.

Geology 
Aracar is located in the Salta province, north of the Salar de Taca Taca and Arizaro and east of the Salar de Incahuasi and the Sierra de Taca Taca, close to the Chilean border. Volcanoes in the territory rise above the endorheic sinks and landscape. Cerro Arizaro (9.0 ± 1.3 mya) is another volcano southeast of Aracar.

The basement consists of Paleozoic granites. The Laguna de Aracar Formation north of Aracar was formed by Gondwana volcanism and has been dated by K-Ar methods to be 266 ± 28 Ma old, and it is associated with the Llullaillaco Unit. Tertiary sedimentary rocks in the east and arenites in the south form the rest of the basement.

Four lava domes extend southeast from the volcano. Grey basaltic lava flows descend from its summit and form a gentle western flank and much steeper eastern, northern and southern flanks. Snowmelt occasionally forms small ephemeral lakes in the main crater. Small southbound andesitic lava flows are associated with the main crater. Some deep gorges cut into the volcano, and erosion has removed  of rock.

A lava field is found beneath Aracar volcano. It is constructed by lava flows that range in composition from basaltic andesite bordering on trachyandesite over dacite and smaller flows of partially silicic magma. They have cancelled out the prior landscape. These lower lava flows reach the Salar de Taca Taca and extend south-southeast. The lava field formed over a north–south slope.

Lavas have gray-black porphyric and in some places vesicular textures. Andesine-labradorite plagioclase and pyroxene phenocrysts are found in the lavas, which has a fine grained groundmass. Apatite, augite and opaque mineral inclusions are also found. Some lava flows display very small scale flow bands with feldspat and plagioclase inclusions. Xenoliths containing quartz and gabbro nodules also have part in the rock composition. The overall rock composition is calc-alkaline, similar to other magmas in the Central Volcanic Zone with some intraplate and crustal components, with the magmas forming in an open magma chamber. Later magmas may have been influenced by entry of basic magmas from the depth.

The volcanic history of Aracar is poorly understood. The bottom lava flows have ages of 3.4 ± 1.2 to 2.6 ± 0.4 mya but an age of 100,000 years has also been given. Presumably at first fluid basaltic lavas were erupted. Subsequently, dacite lavas were erupted, accompanied with the formation of a strong slope in the edifice and hydrothermal activity at a northwestern lava dome. Finally the central crater and andesite lava flows were erupted. Beneath  altitude lava flows are well conserved. Satellite images did not detect any deformation of the edifice during this episode, probably due to aliasing. Aracar is considered Argentina's 17th most dangerous volcano out of 38.

History and human interaction
The mountain was climbed in 1958 by European climbers including Mathias Rebitsch, who found an archeological site in the summit area. Mine fields are present on the northeastern flanks of Aracar, making exploration from that side impossible. A major Inca archeological site is found on Aracar. Two separate places exist on the summit and the secondary crater. The summit place is formed by a stone circle and low stone walls which are placed just above the slopes down into the main crater. A terrace shaped stone structure forms the secondary crater place, being placed on its slopes. A smaller terrace is located on its northeastern side. Timber and wood are found around the stone structures. These structures may be a sanctuary site that could be accessed by a bystanding public during ceremonies, with the sites themselves located within wind protected areas.

Notes

See also
 List of volcanoes in Argentina
 List of Ultras of South America
 Ojos de Mar
 Pular
 Socompa

References

External links
 "Cerro Aracar, Argentina" on Peakbagger
  (in Spanish; also includes volcanoes of Argentina)

Stratovolcanoes of Argentina
Subduction volcanoes
Active volcanoes
Mountains of Argentina
Volcanic crater lakes
Polygenetic volcanoes
Six-thousanders of the Andes
Puna de Atacama
Pliocene stratovolcanoes
Pleistocene stratovolcanoes